Franz Oppenheim (born 13 July 1852 in Charlottenburg; died 13 February 1929 in Cairo) was a German chemist and industrialist who mainly worked for the Agfa company (now Agfa-Gevaert). His father was German jurist Otto Georg Oppenheim and his mother was Margarethe Mendelssohn (1823–1890). His sisters were Else (1844–1868) and Enole Oppenheim (1855–1939). He lived with his family in Berlin-Wannsee.

Life
Oppenheim went to school at Friedrich Wilhelm Gymnasium in Berlin. He studied chemistry in Heildelberg and since 1874 in Bonn. Oppenheim married Else Wollheim (1858–1904), with her he had four children: Rose, Martha, Franz Caesar and Kurt Oppenheim. After the death of his first spouse he married  Margarete Eisner in 1907. 
In Cologne Oppenheim worked first for company Vorster & Grüneberg. Oppenheim worked since 1928 for German company Agfa in Berlin. 
Oppenheim was also an arts collector.

Literature
Fritz Haber : Franz Oppenheim in memory of the anniversary of his death (13 February 1929). At the same time a contribution to the history of the Aktien-Gesellschaft für Anilinfabrikation . In: Journal for applied chemistry . 43, 1930, pp. 141–145, doi: 10.1002 / anie.19300430702 .
Jens Ulrich Heine: A 28 - Franz Oppenheim . In: Mind and Fate. The men of I. G. Farbenindustrie AG in 161 short biographies . Weinheim u. a. 1990, pp. 226–228
Bernd Wöbke: Oppenheim, Franz. In: New German Biography (NDB). Volume 19, Duncker & Humblot, Berlin 1999, p. 563 f. ( Digitized version ).

External links

References

20th-century German chemists
German industrialists
Businesspeople from Berlin
German art collectors
1852 births
1929 deaths
People from Charlottenburg
Agfa
19th-century German chemists